The Volkswagen New Beetle is a compact car, introduced by Volkswagen in 1997, drawing heavy inspiration from the exterior design of the original Beetle. Unlike the original Beetle, the New Beetle has its engine in the front, driving the front wheels, with luggage storage in the rear. Many special editions have been released, such as the Malibu Barbie New Beetle.

In 2011 for the 2012 model year, a new Beetle model, the Beetle (A5), replaced the New Beetle. It is often referred to as the New Beetle as well. Various versions of this model continued to be made in Puebla, Mexico, until the final car left the assembly line on 10 July 2019.

History

At the 1994 North American International Auto Show, Volkswagen unveiled the Concept One, a "retro"-themed concept car with a resemblance to the original Volkswagen Beetle. Designed by J Mays and Freeman Thomas at the company's California design studio, the concept car was based on the platform of the Volkswagen Polo. A red cabriolet concept was featured at the Geneva Motor Show, also in 1994.

Production design approval was reached in mid-1995, with a design freeze resulting in 22 months of development time for production. In October 1995, the Volkswagen Concept Two was shown at the Tokyo Motor Show, essentially an early preview of the production model due in early 1998.

Strong public reaction to the Concept One convinced the company that it should develop a production version which was launched as the New Beetle in 1997 for the 1998 model-year, based on the Golf IV's larger PQ34 platform. The New Beetle is related to the original only in name and appearance (including the absence of a car emblem script with the exception of the VW logo). For the 1998 model year, only the TDI compression-ignition engine was turbocharged; the spark-ignition engines were only naturally aspirated. In June 1999, Volkswagen introduced the 1.8T, which was the first turbocharged spark-ignition engine offered for the New Beetle. Volkswagen created a web site dedicated specifically to the 1.8T. A convertible was added for the 2003 model-year to replace the Volkswagen Cabrio. However, the New Beetle Convertible was never offered with a compression-ignition engine in North America. The third-generation Beetle Convertible, the successor to the New Beetle Convertible, was offered with the TDI compression-ignition engine in the USA but not in Canada, though, making it possibly the only diesel convertible car offered in North America.

The New Beetle carries many design similarities with the original VW Beetle: separate fenders, vestigial running boards, sloping headlamps, and large round taillights, as well as a high rounded roofline. It was assembled in VW's Puebla factory in Mexico.

Specifications
Dimension:
Length: 
Width: 
Height: 
Wheelbase: 
Curb weight: 
Luggage volume: 
Luggage volume with rear seat folded: 
Max speed: 161–225 km/h (110-140 mph)
Acceleration (0–100 km/h | 0-62.5 mph): 6.7-14.6 sec

Body styles

Engine choices

Safety
The New Beetle achieved five stars in the 2011 Euro NCAP tests compared to four stars in the 2000 Euro NCAP tests scoring 25 points (33 to reach five stars).

The Insurance Institute for Highway Safety (IIHS) gave the New Beetle a Good overall score in their frontal crash test. 2004 models come standard with side airbags; however, the IIHS rated the Beetle Poor in their side impact test.

United States models
Engine choices include the  2.0 L inline-four for the base model, the  1.9 L TDI turbodiesel inline-four (discontinued after the 2006 model year due to more stringent emissions requirements), and the  1.8 L turbo inline-four for the Turbo and Sport models.

It also included a sport suspension, six-speed manual transmission, aluminum interior trim, revised front/rear fascias, and bigger wheels and tires. A close relative of the Turbo S was the 2002–2004 Color Concept. This limited edition variant was available in limited exterior colors, with interior door panel inserts, seat inserts, floor mat piping, and wheel opening inserts color-matched to the exterior paint. Wheel color inserts, diameter, and style varied with model year. It came standard with the  1.8 turbo gasoline engine, 5-speed manual gearbox, speed-activated rear spoiler, power windows/sunroof/door locks, heated leather seats, and fog lamps.

All 1.8L Turbo and Turbo S inline-four models were equipped with a retractable rear spoiler which was not available on the 1.9 L TDI inline-4, 2.0 L inline-four and 2.5 L inline-five models.

The New Beetle would not be given the upgraded 2.5 L engine (engine code CBTA/CBUA) that 2008 and later Jettas and Rabbits received.

Special editions

Beetle RSi (2001–2003)

The RSi is a limited 250 unit version of the New Beetle. It included a  3.2-litre VR6 engine, a 6-speed gearbox, and Volkswagen's four-wheel drive system 4motion, Remus twin-pipe exhaust. It was rumored Porsche tuned the suspension but the suspension tuning was actually carried out in-house at VW Individual. The suspension was greatly altered at the rear, with geometry more geared to the race track and a rear cross brace behind the rear seats,  wider fenders, unique front and rear bumpers, a rear diffuser, large rear wing, and 18x9 OZ Superturismo wheels with 235/40ZR-18 tires. Inside, it was trimmed in carbon fiber, billet aluminum, and bright orange leather. The front seats were Recaro racing buckets. Notable disadvantages found were loud cabin noise and shorter rear tire life.

Ragster concept

At the 2005 North American International Auto Show, the Volkswagen New Beetle Ragster concept car was introduced. It was supposed to be a preview of the future design of the New Beetle. The base of the Ragster (the name denoting a cross between a "ragtop" and a speedster) was a New Beetle Convertible modified with a new roof, giving it a much lower roofline, and a unique paint job with silver double stripes. The interior differs from the original New Beetle, being a 2+2, and having distinctive control dials. The Ragster's rear-view mirror is mounted on its dashboard, a retro feature, reminiscent of the first Type 1s.

Wolfsburg Edition
The Wolfsburg edition was first released in 2000 with a limited supply being distributed to a select few countries, including the USA, England, Australia, and Japan. These came in a limited color choice of white, black, and silver, all sporting a black roof and older styled alloy mag wheels styled off the original beetle steel wheels. They all came in the 2.0L 5-speed manual only, no automatic option was available. They also had the VW emblem in chrome on black which is similar to what was already being used in the USA, although other countries had chrome and blue VW emblems. They were priced at a higher price point than the standard (approx $3000 more depending on the country) which did not buy a lot of value other than a more stylish look. This model was soon dropped and later replaced with an unlimited IQ model in white and black.

Blush (2009)

The Blush is a limited New Beetle convertible with a special "white gold" exterior paint and "Bordeaux red" convertible top, with burgundy leather seats matching the convertible top color. Neither the white gold exterior nor interior colors were available on other 2009 New Beetle convertibles. 1500 New Beetle Blush convertibles were produced.

Final edition (2010)
Announced at the 2009 Los Angeles Auto Show, the 2010 Final Edition New Beetle features Aquarius Blue paintwork, with the hardtop receiving a black painted roof and the convertible sporting Campanella White painted side panels. In addition to unique 17-inch wheels, both models will be powered by a 2.5-liter engine mated to an automatic "Tiptronic" transmission. Other additions include sports suspension and "Final Edition" badging inside and out. Both models arrive with integrated fog lights and Electronic Stability Programme (ESP) as standard.

The "Final Edition" marked the end of production of the New Beetle. It was succeeded in 2011 by the Beetle (A5).

BlackOrange Edition (2010)
In 2010, Volkswagen Australia offered a final limited edition variant named as BlackOrange Edition. Two-color combinations are available: Black gloss exterior with silver mirrors, silver alloy wheels and silver decals for the lower flanks of the body, or Red Rock metallic exterior with black roof/mirrors, black alloy wheels and black decals for the lower flanks. All these BlackOrange Edition came with 17-inch alloy wheels, sports suspension, leatherette seat upholstery, cruise control, front fog lights, tinted rear side/rear windows, aluminium pedals and leather-bound steering wheel/gear knob.

Final Edition
The factory in Puebla, Mexico manufactured 3000 Final Edition versions. They were available as a coupe and as a convertible. "The Final Edition beetle features a special Aquarius Blue paint with a painted black roof on the coupe, and a two-tone Aquarius Blue and Campanella White paint scheme with a white top on the convertible. Both the coupe and the convertible have a full sport suspension and special 17-inch alloy wheels."

Awards
The Volkswagen New Beetle was Motor Trends "Import Car of the Year" for 1999.

See also
Punch buggy
Hot hatch
Beetle Adventure Racing

References

Notes

Bibliography

General

Workshop manuals

External links

 Official New Beetle website (dead link - 03/30/2014)

Beetle, New
Compact cars
Euro NCAP small family cars
Hatchbacks
Front-wheel-drive vehicles
Coupés
Convertibles
2000s cars
2010s cars
Cars introduced in 1998
Cars powered by VR engines
Rally cars
Retro-style automobiles